Education Corps may refer to:

Education Corps (Iran), 1972 winner of the UNESCO Nadezhda K. Krupskaya literacy prize
Education and Youth Corps, Israel Defense Forces corps responsible for the education of soldiers
Pakistan Army Education Corps, a corps within the Pakistan Army
Royal Army Educational Corps, former corps of the British Army tasked with educating and instructing personnel
Royal Australian Army Educational Corps, a specialist corps within the Australian Army
Army Education Corps (India), an Indian Army Corps